Detlef Gromoll (13 May 1938 – 31 May 2008) was a mathematician who worked in Differential geometry.

Biography

Gromoll was born in Berlin in 1938, and was a classically trained violinist. 
After living and attending school in Rosdorf and graduating from high school in Bonn, he obtained his Ph.D. in mathematics at the University of Bonn in 1964. 
Following sojourns at several universities, he joined the State University of New York at Stony Brook in 1969.

He married Suzan L. Lemay on 29 December 1971, and they had three children together: Hans Christian (also a mathematician), Heidi, and Stefan, a physicist & cofounder of Scientific Media.

See also
Abresch–Gromoll inequality
Rational homotopy theory
Splitting theorem
Soul theorem

References

External links
 
 

1938 births
2008 deaths
Differential geometers
20th-century German mathematicians
People from Göttingen (district)
University of Bonn alumni
Stony Brook University faculty
German emigrants to the United States